Julian Schwermann (born 8 July 1999) is a German professional footballer who plays as a defensive midfielder for Regionalliga West club Alemannia Aachen.

Club career
Born in Sundern, Schwermann played youth football with TuS Sundern and Borussia Dortmund and senior football with Borussia Dortmund II in the Regionalliga West before signing for SC Verl in the 3. Liga in July 2020 after his contract with Borussia Dortmund II expired.

After leaving Verl in summer 2022, he signed for Regionalliga West club Alemannia Aachen.

International career
Schwermann has represented Germany at under-15, under-16, under-17 and under-18 level.

References

External links
 
 
 

1999 births
Living people
German footballers
People from Sundern
Sportspeople from Arnsberg (region)
Footballers from North Rhine-Westphalia
Association football midfielders
Borussia Dortmund II players
SC Verl players
Alemannia Aachen players
Regionalliga players
3. Liga players